The Lubue River runs from south to north through Idiofa territory, Kwilu province, Democratic Republic of the Congo.
It becomes navigable at Mulasa, and below this point meanders through a very wide and wooded valley. It enters the Kasai near the town of Dibaya Lubue.

References

Rivers of the Democratic Republic of the Congo
Kwilu Province
Kasai River